Rhomballichthys is a genus of gastrotrichs belonging to the family Chaetonotidae.

Species:

Rhomballichthys carinatus 
Rhomballichthys murray 
Rhomballichthys punctatus

References

Gastrotricha